Aiguobasinwin Ovonramwen, Eweka II (died February 1933) was the Oba of Benin from 1914 to 1933.

He was the son of Ovonramwen (ruled 1888–1897), who was deposed by the British and exiled to Calabar following the British punitive expedition in Benin City in 1897. Aiguobasin Ovonramwen worked with the colonial government as a chief from 1902 onwards.

Ovonramwen died in January 1914, and Aiguobasinwin Ovonramwen was enthroned as the Oba of Benin on 24 July 1914. He took the name Eweka II after the 13th-century founder of the dynasty and the first Oba of Benin Eweka I.

Eweka II rebuilt the royal palace, which had been destroyed and looted by the British in 1897. He also reestablished the traditional structure of the kingdom. The royal coral regalia of Ovonramwen seized by the British was returned. Eweka II also restored the craft guilds, commissioning objects to replace those looted by the British, and started the Benin Arts and Crafts School.

He died in February 1933.

References 

1933 deaths
Nigerian royalty
Date of birth missing
Date of death missing
Place of birth missing
Place of death missing
Edo people
19th-century Nigerian people
20th-century Nigerian people
Obas of Benin

Known Descendants: Idiaru Eweka